The chairmen of the State Council of Imperial Russia

1810–1906
Concurrently chairmen of the Committee of Ministers to 1865.

1906–1917

Politics of the Russian Empire
Russian Empire